The following is a list of Malayalam films released in the year 2005.

Dubbed films

 2005
2005
Lists of 2005 films by country or language
2005 in Indian cinema